The palatal nasal click is a click consonant found primarily among the languages of southern Africa.

Features
Features of the palatal nasal click:

Occurrence
Palatal nasal clicks are only found in the various Khoisan languages families of southern Africa and in the neighboring Yeyi language.

Glottalized palatal nasal click

All Khoisan languages, and a few Bantu languages, have glottalized nasal clicks. These are formed by closing the glottis so that the click is pronounced in silence; however, any preceding vowel will be nasalized.

References

Nasal consonants
Click consonants
Central consonants
Palatal consonants
Voiced consonants